Téclaire Bille Esono (7 July 1988 – 15 December 2010) was an Equatoguinean footballer. She played at a club level for Bellas Artes, and for the Equatorial Guinea women's national football team.

Early life
Bille, who was born in Douala, Cameroon and later emigrated to Equatorial Guinea.

Career

Club
She played as defender during her career in Cameroon, and for Equatorial Guinean club side Bellas Artes.

International
She played for the Equatorial Guinea women's national football team, and was a member of the team that lost in the final 4–2 against Nigeria in the 2010 African Women's Championship. This result qualified Equatorial Guinea for the following year's FIFA Women's World Cup in Germany.

Death
She was killed, alongside her eldest brother and Pablo Boyas on 15 December 2010 in a traffic accident between Yaoundé and Douala in Cameroon. At the time of her death, she had already begun to prepare for the 2011 Women's World Cup. The Nigerian Football Federation released a statement consoling the player's death, saying that she performed "with verve and vivacity, commitment and passion".

Honours
Equatorial Guinea
African Women's Championship: Winner in 2008 and runner-up in 2010

References 

1988 births
2010 deaths
Footballers from Douala
Women's association football defenders
Cameroonian women's footballers
Cameroonian emigrants to Equatorial Guinea
Naturalized citizens of Equatorial Guinea
Equatoguinean women's footballers
Equatorial Guinea women's international footballers
Road incident deaths in Cameroon